Trigonopterus duabelas is a species of flightless weevil in the genus Trigonopterus from Indonesia.

Etymology
The specific name is derived from the Indonesian word for "twelve".

Description
Individuals measure 2.2–2.8 mm in length.  General coloration is black, with rust-colored tarsi and antennae.  The entire legs are rust-colored in the Mount Slamet population.

Range

Phylogeny
T. duabelas is part of the T. dimorphus species group.

References

duabelas
Beetles described in 2014
Beetles of Asia
Insects of Indonesia